James Rennie (1826–1924) was a Scottish professional golfer who played in the late 19th century. Rennie had three top-10 finishes in the Open Championship, his best effort being fifth in the 1875 Open Championship.

Early life
Rennie was born in Scotland circa 1826.

Golf career

1875 Open Championship
The 1875 Open Championship was the 15th Open Championship, held 10 September at Prestwick Golf Club in Prestwick, South Ayrshire, Scotland. Willie Park, Sr. won the Championship by two strokes from runner-up Bob Martin. Willie Park, who had won the first Championship in 1860, equalled Tom Morris, Jr.'s record of four Championship wins. Rennie had rounds of 61-59-57=177 and won £1 in prize money.

Death
Rennie died in 1924.

Results in The Open Championship

Note: Rennie played only in The Open Championship.

DNP = Did not play
"T" = Tied for a place
Yellow background for top-10

References

Scottish male golfers
1826 births
1924 deaths